Daithí Burke (born 16 November 1992) is an Irish hurler and Gaelic footballer who plays at senior level for the Galway county hurling team and for his clubs Turloughmore and Corofin.

Burke made his debut for Galway against Laois, and was part of the team that reached the 2015 All-Ireland Senior Hurling Championship Final after defeating Tipperary in the semi-final.

On 3 September 2017, Burke started at full-back for Galway as they won their first All-Ireland Senior Hurling Championship in 29 years against Waterford.

He has also played for NUI Galway.

In February 2022, Burke was named captain of the Galway senior hurling team.

Career statistics

Honours
Hurling
All-Ireland Minor Hurling Championship (1): 2009
National Hurling League Division 1 (2): 2017, 2021
Leinster Senior Hurling Championship (2): 2017, 2018
All-Ireland Senior Hurling Championship (1): 2017

Football
Galway Senior Club Football Championship (8): 2011, 2013, 2014, 2015, 2016, 2017, 2018, 2019
Connacht Senior Club Football Championship (5): 2014, 2016, 2017,2018, 2019
All-Ireland Senior Club Football Championship (4): 2015, 2018, 2019, 2020
Connacht Under-21 Football Championship (1): 2013
All-Ireland Under-21 Football Championship (1): 2013

Awards
The Sunday Game Hurling Team of the Year (1): 2018
GAA GPA All Stars Awards (5): 2015, 2016, 2017, 2018, 2020

References

1992 births
Living people
Allied Irish Banks people
All-Ireland Senior Hurling Championship winners
All Stars Awards winners (hurling)
Alumni of the University of Galway
Corofin Gaelic footballers
Dual players
Galway inter-county hurlers
Hurling backs
Turloughmore hurlers
University of Galway hurlers